Rudabad (also Romanized as Rūdābād; also known as Rūdbār) is a village in Padena-ye Sofla Rural District, Padena District, Semirom County, Isfahan Province, Iran. At the 2006 census, its population was 433, in 99 families.

References 

Populated places in Semirom County